Veli-Pekka Harjola (born 10 January 1963 in Helsinki) is a Finnish sprint canoeist who competed in the mid-1980s. He was eliminated in the semifinals of both the K-1 1000 m and the K-4 1000 m events at the 1984 Summer Olympics in Los Angeles.

References
Sports-Reference.com profile

1963 births
Living people
Sportspeople from Helsinki
Canoeists at the 1984 Summer Olympics
Finnish male canoeists
Olympic canoeists of Finland